Roksana Khudoyarova (born 30 January 2001) is a Uzbekistani athlete. She competed in the women's triple jump at the 2020 Summer Olympics.

References

External links
 

2001 births
Living people
Uzbekistani female triple jumpers
Athletes (track and field) at the 2020 Summer Olympics
Olympic athletes of Uzbekistan
Place of birth missing (living people)
Athletes (track and field) at the 2018 Summer Youth Olympics
21st-century Uzbekistani women
Islamic Solidarity Games medalists in athletics